Agirre is a Basque surname. Notable people with the surname include:

 Naroa Agirre (born 1979), Spanish pole vaulter
 Josu Agirre (born 1981), Spanish cyclist
 Jon Agirre (born 1997), Spanish cyclist

See also
Aguirre (surname)

Basque-language surnames